Kushano-Sasanian Kingdom (also called Kushanshahs, KΟÞANΟ ÞAΟ or Koshano Shao in Bactrian, or Indo-Sasanians) is a historiographic term used by modern scholars to refer to a branch of the Sasanian Persians who established their rule in Bactria during the 3rd and 4th centuries CE at the expense of the declining Kushans. They captured the provinces of Sogdiana, Bactria and Gandhara from the Kushans in 225 CE. The Sasanians established governors for the Sasanian Empire, who minted their own coinage and took the title of Kushanshas, i.e. "Kings of the Kushans". They are sometimes considered as forming a "sub-kingdom" inside the Sasanian Empire. This administration continued until 360-370 CE, when the Kushano-Sasanians lost much of its domains to the invading Kidarite Huns, whilst the rest was incorporated into the imperial Sasanian Empire. Later, the Kidarites were in turn displaced by the Hephthalites. The Sasanians were able to re-establish some authority after they destroyed the Hephthalites with the help of the Turks in 565, but their rule collapsed under Arab attacks in the mid 7th century.

The Kushanshas are mainly known through their coins. Their coins were minted at Kabul, Balkh, Herat, and Merv, attesting the extent of their realm.

A rebellion of Hormizd I Kushanshah (277–286 CE), who issued coins with the title Kushanshahanshah ("King of kings of the Kushans"), seems to have occurred against contemporary emperor Bahram II (276–293 CE) of the Sasanian Empire, but failed.

History

First Kushano-Sassanid period (230-365 CE)
The Sassanids, shortly after victory over the Parthians, extended their dominion into Bactria during the reign of Ardashir I around 230 CE, then further to the eastern parts of their empire in western Pakistan during the reign of his son Shapur I (240–270). Thus the Kushans lost their western territory (including Bactria and Gandhara) to the rule of Sassanid nobles named Kushanshahs or "Kings of the Kushans". The farthest extent of the Kushano-Sasanians to the east appears to have been Gandhara, and they apparently did not cross the Indus river, since almost none of their coinage has been found in the city of Taxila just beyond the Indus.

The Kushano-Sasanians under Hormizd I Kushanshah seem to have led a rebellion against contemporary emperor Bahram II (276-293 CE) of the Sasanian Empire, but failed. According to the Panegyrici Latini (3rd-4th century CE), there was a rebellion of a certain Ormis (Ormisdas) against his brother Bahram II, and Ormis was supported the people of Saccis (Sakastan). Hormizd I Kushanshah issued coins with the title Kushanshahanshah ("King of kings of the Kushans"), probably in defiance of imperial Sasanian rule.

Around 325, Shapur II was directly in charge of the southern part of the territory, while in the north the Kushanshahs maintained their rule. Important finds of Sasanian coinage beyond the Indus in the city of Taxila only start with the reigns of Shapur II (r.309-379) and Shapur III (r.383-388), suggesting that the expansion of Sasanian control beyond the Indus was the result of the wars of Shapur II "with the Chionites and Kushans" in 350-358 as described by Ammianus Marcellinus. They probably maintained control until the rise of the Kidarites under their ruler Kidara.

The decline of the Kushans and their defeat by the Kushano-Sasanians and the Sasanians, was followed by the rise of the Kidarites and then the Hephthalites (Alchon Huns) who in turn conquered Bactria and Gandhara and went as far as central India. They were later followed by Turk Shahi and then the Hindu Shahi, until the arrival of Muslims to north-western parts of India.

Second Sassanid period (565-651 CE)
The Hephthalites dominated the area until they were defeated in 565 CE by an alliance between the First Turkic Khaganate and the Sasanian Empire, and some Sassanid authority was re-established in eastern lands. According to al-Tabari, Khosrow I managed, through his expansionist policy, to take control of "Sind, Bust, Al-Rukkhaj, Zabulistan, Tukharistan, Dardistan, and Kabulistan".

The Hephthalites were able to set up rival states in Kapisa, Bamiyan, and Kabul, before being overrun by the Tokhara Yabghus and the Turk Shahi. The Sasanians may also have expelled by the Nezak-Alchons. The 2nd Indo-Sassanid period ended with the collapse of Sassanids to the Rashidun Caliphate in the mid 7th century. Sind remained independent until the Arab invasions of India in the early 8th century.

Religious influences

Coins depicting Shiva and the Nandi bull have been discovered, indicating a strong influence of Shaivite Hinduism.

The prophet Mani (210–276 CE), founder of Manichaeism, followed the Sassanids' expansion to the east, which exposed him to the thriving Buddhist culture of Gandhara. He is said to have visited Bamiyan, where several religious paintings are attributed to him, and is believed to have lived and taught for some time. He is also related to have sailed to the Indus valley area now in modern-day Pakistan in 240 or 241 AD, and to have converted a Buddhist King, the Turan Shah of India.

On that occasion, various Buddhist influences seem to have permeated Manichaeism: "Buddhist influences were significant in the formation of Mani's religious thought. The transmigration of souls became a Manichaean belief, and the quadripartite structure of the Manichaean community, divided between male and female monks (the 'elect') and lay follower (the 'hearers') who supported them, appears to be based on that of the Buddhist sangha"

Coinage
The Kushano-Sassanids created an extensive coinage with legend in Brahmi, Pahlavi or Bactrian, sometimes inspired from Kushan coinage, and sometimes more clearly Sassanid.

The obverse of the coin usually depicts the ruler with elaborate headdress and on the reverse either a Zoroastrian fire altar, or Shiva with the bull Nandi.

Main Kushano-Sassanid rulers
The following Kushanshahs were:

 Ardashir I Kushanshah (230–245)
 Peroz I Kushanshah (245–275)
 Hormizd I Kushanshah (275–300)
 Hormizd II Kushanshah (300–303)
 Peroz II Kushanshah (303–330)
 Varahran Kushanshah (330-365)

Kushano-Sasanian art
The Indo-Sassanids traded goods such as silverware and textiles depicting the Sassanid emperors engaged in hunting or administering justice.

Artistic influences
The example of Sassanid art was influential on Kushan art, and this influence remained active for several centuries in the northwest South Asia. Plates seemingly belonging to the art of the Kushano-Sasanians have also been found in Northern Wei tombs in China, such as a plate depicting a boar hunt found in the 504 CE tomb of Feng Hetu.

See also

 

 Indo-Parthian

References

Sources

External links
 Coins of the Kushano-Sassanids

Ancient history of Pakistan
Ancient history of Afghanistan
Sasanian Empire